Inonotus acutus is a species of fungus in the family Hymenochaetaceae. It is characterized by having small and thin basidiocarps, a sharp pileus margin, ventricose hymenial setae, and ellipsoid, yellowish and thick-walled basidiospores.

References

Further reading
Dai, Yu-Cheng, et al. "Wood-inhabiting fungi in southern China. 4. Polypores from Hainan Province." Annales Botanici Fennici. Vol. 48. No. 3. Finnish Zoological and Botanical Publishing Board, 2011.

External links 
 

Fungal tree pathogens and diseases
acutus
Fungi described in 2011